Bible Society New Zealand is a Christian organisation dedicated to supplying bibles within New Zealand, and supporting Bible Societies around the world to do the same within their respective countries.  They aim to serve the whole Christian community by working closely with churches to serve all denominations.  The organisation has approximately 30 paid employees, and around 700 volunteers throughout New Zealand.

Bible Society New Zealand was established in 1846 and is a donor supported non-profit society that receives no Government funding and depends on prayers and financial support of Christian individuals and churches.  It is a member of the United Bible Societies, a fellowship of 146 Bible Societies throughout the world which co-operate to make the Bible available to people everywhere in a language they can understand and at a price they can afford.

Publishing
Bible Society New Zealand publishes a wide variety of non-denominational Scriptures and resources for churches and Christians to use.  This includes leaflets for children and adults that tell the Christmas and Easter story and share Bible answers to life's questions, New Testaments for outreach, gospels for Easter camps, full waterproof Bibles for New Zealand Defence Force personnel, Christian story books for school and many more.

Sometimes Bible Society New Zealand initiates a publishing project and sees it through themselves, but more often they work with another organisation that has a particular need or audience, and partner to publish what they require for their outreach or ministry.  The society also publishes Bibles for general reading, in English and a number of Pacific Island languages.

Due to being part of United Bible Societies, the world's largest Bible translating and publishing organisation, Bible Society New Zealand doesn't always have to do the publishing themselves.  Through partnering with other Bible Societies, they are able to stock and distribute a huge range of Bibles and other material in most English Bible versions and in most other major languages.

Recent projects
In the early days, Bible Society New Zealand volunteers walked or travelled on horseback throughout frontier regions in New Zealand, distributing Bibles to remote settlers and Māori people.  In 2009, acclaimed children's author Joy Cowley teamed up with Bible Society New Zealand to write Tārore Story which was distributed free to 240,000 school children across New Zealand.  It is the true story of a Māori girl named Tārore, the events surrounding her death in 1836 and the impact her death had upon the Māori people of Aotearoa.

In a military world first, the New Zealand Defence Force New Testament was published in 2013.  Chaplain Class One Lance Lukin perceived a need for this project and contacted Bible Society New Zealand to make it happen. The New Testament is a purpose-made, waterproof, tear resistant, military book and is endorsed by renowned adventurer and former soldier, Bear Grylls.  5000 copies were printed and distributed to new recruits, and a reprint is in progress.

Other projects that Bible Society New Zealand has recently completed include reformatting of the Maori Bible published in 1952, and the first Tokelauan New Testament was launched in June 2009.

Current projects include the first Māori Children's Bible to be completed by 2015, and a complete Tokelauan Bible due to be completed in 2016.

Bible Society New Zealand is located in Wellington, New Zealand.

References

External links
Bible Society New Zealand
United Bible Societies

Sources
 
 
 
 

Bible societies
Book publishing companies of New Zealand
Charities based in New Zealand
Christianity in New Zealand
Religious organizations established in 1846
1846 establishments in New Zealand